Pyliava is a village (selo) in central Ukraine. It is located in the Stara Synyava Raion (district) of the Khmelnytskyi Oblast (province), by the river Ikva.

Podolia Voivodeship

Villages in Khmelnytskyi Raion